Kyla Bremner (born 28 January 1977 in Powell River, British Columbia, Canada) is an Australian freestyle wrestler. She competed for Australia at the 2008 Olympics. She lost to Korean Hyung-Joo Kim in the first round and was eliminated.

References

1977 births
Australian people of Canadian descent
Australian people of Scottish descent
Australian female sport wrestlers
Canadian people of Scottish descent
Living people
Olympic wrestlers of Australia
People from Powell River, British Columbia
Sportspeople from British Columbia
Wrestlers at the 2008 Summer Olympics